The 1983–84 season was the 104th season of competitive football by Rangers.

Overview
Rangers played a total of 55 competitive matches during the 1983–84 season. The season would signal the end of John Greig's managerial career. The league season began badly, one point from the first four league games, although the team did win their six League Cup games under Greig. A fruitful brief run in the European Cup Winner's Cup saw Rangers win the second round, first leg 2–1 over F.C. Porto (runners up) after the team's record breaking 18-0 aggregate win over Maltese champions Valletta. After the first nine league games, Greig's team had collected just seven points from eighteen and, in the end, the pressure was too much for Greig who ultimately resigned as manager on 28 October 1983.

Rangers were overseen by former midfielder Tommy McLean, who acted as caretaker, whilst attempts were made to find a new permanent manager. On 10 November 1983, Jock Wallace was persuaded by the Rangers board to leave Motherwell and return to the club. His aim was to restore the glory years of the treble-winning sides of the late 1970s. Wallace's initial impact was positive, boosting morale and fitness. He made changes to the coaching staff, bringing in Alex Totten as first team coach with Tommy McLean, David Provan and Joe Mason leaving. Wallace also added to the squad during the season; Bobby Williamson arrived from Clydebank, Nicky Walker from old club Motherwell and Stuart Munro from Alloa Athletic.

Wallace's first match in command was at Pittodrie on 12 November 1983. The game finished in a 3–0 defeat but subsequently the side went on a 22 match unbeaten run in all competitions until March 1984. However, Rangers still ended that season fourth in the league, fifteen points behind champions Aberdeen. The club did win a trophy, the League Cup. The cup final was a thrilling extra-time victory over Celtic, with Ally McCoist getting a hat-trick, in the 3–2 win that won them the cup.

Results
All results are written with Rangers' score first.

Scottish Premier Division

Cup Winners' Cup

Scottish Cup

League Cup

Glasgow Cup (1982-83 competition)

Appearances

League table

See also
 1983–84 in Scottish football
 1983–84 Scottish Cup
 1983–84 Scottish League Cup
 1983–84 European Cup Winners' Cup

References 

Rangers F.C. seasons
Rangers